Dana Winner (born Chantal Ernestine Vanlee on 10 February 1965 in Hasselt) is a Belgian singer.

Biography
In 1990 she released her first single Op het dak van de wereld, (Dutch: "On the roof of the world"), a cover of The Carpenters' Top of the World from 1973. In 1993 she became really popular with Woordenloos (Dutch: "Without words"). However, it was only in 1995 that she released her only hit single so far to reach the Dutch Top 40, Westenwind. This was a cover of the former hit One Way Wind by the Volendam group The Cats.

After her first success, Dana Winner also became well known in Germany and South Africa. At the end of the 1990s, she began singing in other languages and did not release an album in Dutch between 2000 and 2006.

Discography
(1989): Op Het Dak Van De Wereld...
(1991): Adios
(1993): Regenbogen
(1994): Mijn Paradijs
(1995): Regen Van Geluk
(1996): Waar Is Het Gevoel? 
(1997): Wo Ist Das Gefühl?
(1997): Geef Me Je Droom 
(1998): In Love With You
(1999): Yours Forever
(1999): Ergens In Mijn Hart
(1999): Mein Weg... 
(2000): Licht En Liefde
(2001): Rainbows Of Love
(2001): Unforgettable
(2002): Unforgettable Too
(2003): One Way Wind
(2003): Märchenland Der Gefühle
(2005): Beautiful Life
(2005): Het Laatste Nieuws
(2006): Als Je Lacht
(2008): Tussen Nu En Morgen
(2010): Parels Uit De Noordzee
(2011): Kerst Met Dana Winner
(2016): ′′One Moment in Time (2016): Puur''

References

 Official homepage

1965 births
Living people
Belgian women singers
People from Hasselt
English-language singers from Belgium 

es:Dana Winner#top